Richard Parris (born 13 December 1845, date of death unknown) was a Barbadian cricketer. He played in two first-class matches for the Barbados cricket team in 1864/65 and 1865/66.

See also
 List of Barbadian representative cricketers

References

External links
 

1845 births
Year of death missing
Barbadian cricketers
Barbados cricketers
People from Saint Thomas, Barbados